Vlad Alin Bujor (born 3 February 1989 in Satu Mare) is a Romanian footballer who plays as a forward for Avântul Reghin. He scored his first goal against FC Universitatea Craiova, from the penalty spot, in the opening day of Liga II 2013–2014. Bujor scored his third goal for the club against Metalul Reșița, in the 13th round of Liga II.

References

External links
 
 
 

1989 births
Living people
Sportspeople from Satu Mare
Romanian footballers
Association football forwards
Liga I players
Liga II players
Liga III players
Nemzeti Bajnokság I players
TFF First League players
FC Politehnica Iași (1945) players
FC U Craiova 1948 players
Mersin İdman Yurdu footballers
Zalaegerszegi TE players
ASA 2013 Târgu Mureș players
FC Olimpia Satu Mare players
LPS HD Clinceni players
ACS Foresta Suceava players
Sepsi OSK Sfântu Gheorghe players
CS Pandurii Târgu Jiu players
Romanian expatriate footballers
Expatriate footballers in Turkey
Romanian expatriate sportspeople in Turkey
Expatriate footballers in Hungary
Romanian expatriate sportspeople in Hungary